Christopher D'Wayne Jackson (born April 13, 1998) is an American football cornerback for the Tennessee Titans of the National Football League (NFL). He played college football at Marshall. He was drafted by the Titans in the seventh round of the 2020 NFL Draft.

College career
Jackson was a member of the Marshall Thundering Herd for four seasons. He was named first-team All-Conference USA after making 25 tackles with one interception and 11 passes broken up as a senior. Jackson finished his collegiate career with 189 total tackles, 6.5 tackles for loss, seven interceptions, 45 passes defensed and two fumble recoveries in 47 games.

Professional career
Jackson was selected by the Tennessee Titans in the seventh round with the 243rd overall pick in the 2020 NFL Draft. He was placed on the reserve/COVID-19 list by the team on November 28, 2020, and activated on December 10.

On November 23, 2021, Jackson was placed on injured reserve. He was activated on December 23.

On August 30, 2022, Jackson was waived by the Titans and signed to the practice squad the next day. He was promoted to the active roster on September 16, 2022. He was placed on injured reserve on September 21.

References

External links
Marshall Thundering Herd bio
Tennessee Titans bio

1998 births
Living people
American football safeties
American football cornerbacks
Marshall Thundering Herd football players
Players of American football from Minneapolis
Players of American football from Tallahassee, Florida
Tennessee Titans players